Ohio National Guard Armory is a registered historic building in Cincinnati, Ohio, listed in the National Register on March 3, 1980. It was designed by Samuel Hannaford who won a competition for the design, beating out Charles Crapsey and others.

Historic uses 

Military Facility

Notes 

National Register of Historic Places in Cincinnati